The Mystic River Bascule Bridge is a bascule bridge spanning the Mystic River in Mystic, Connecticut in the United States. It carries vehicle and foot traffic directly into the tourist district of town via  Main Street (U.S. Route 1).

History
The counterweighted four bar linkage type bascule bridge was designed by former Otis Elevator Company Chief Engineer Thomas Ellis Brown of New York and built in 1922 by the J. E. FitzGerald Construction Company of New London, Connecticut, according to its historical marker. Until 1928, the bridge carried streetcars of the Groton and Stonington Street Railway.

It is operated by the Connecticut Department of Transportation and opens for approximately five minutes around 2,200 times per year, carrying an average daily traffic of 11,800. It is driven by two   direct current motors, and its span is greased and inspected every 100 openings or two weeks during the winter. From May 1 to October 31, the bridge opens hourly during daylight at 40 minutes past the hour and on demand.  It usually raises to let sailboats and yachts pass under.

Pictures

See also
List of bascule bridges
List of bridges documented by the Historic American Engineering Record in Connecticut
List of movable bridges in Connecticut
Mystic Pizza

References

External links

Webcam showing bascule bridge in Mystic

Bridges completed in 1922
Bascule bridges in the United States
Mystic, Connecticut
Groton, Connecticut
Historic American Engineering Record in Connecticut
Bridges in New London County, Connecticut
Road bridges in Connecticut